The Independence Day of Trujillo is a civic celebration held in the Peruvian city of Trujillo. This celebration has as central day in December 29 of every year in commemoration to the proclamation of the Independence of Trujillo that took place in 1820 and it is presented several ceremonies and cultural events in the city. On the commemoration of this civic date it is declared a holiday for the whole province for the festivities of this celebration.

Description
 
The celebration includes some ceremonies and events like the following:

Formal sitting, chaired by the Mayor of the city.
Theatre performance, of the proclamation of independence of Trujillo.
Gala performance, of the Trujillo symphony orchestra at Theatre Municipal.
Hoisting to  the flag of the city
Civic military parade
Mass, presided by Archbishop of Trujillo with the participation of  authorities and officials of the city. 
Artistic and cultural Night, held in the main square.

See also
Trujillo
Marinera Festival
Trujillo Spring Festival
Las Delicias beach
Huanchaco
Santiago de Huamán
Victor Larco Herrera District

References

External links
Location of Trujillo city (Wikimapia)

Media

Cultural Promotion Center of Trujillo

Festivals in Trujillo, Peru
History of Trujillo, Peru